Theo Baloyi is a South African entrepreneur, and the founder and chief executive officer of Bathu Shoes. He launched his eponymous shoe brand in 2015, having previously served as a Senior Associate at PwC in Dubai. He was featured in the Forbes 30 Under 30 list in 2019. In 2021, he won GQ's Business Leader of the Year.

Early life 
Baloyi was born and raised in Hammanskraal, Gauteng where he also spent his childhood. His father, Solly Baloyi, quit his nursing job to become a real estate agent and he died in 2014 His mother, Tshidi Baloyi, is of Zulu descent. He has a sister called Goitsimang Baloyi. Baloyi did his childhood education at Shalom Primary School, thereafter he was enrolled for high school. In 2009, Baloyi relocated to Johannesburg and studied BCom Accounting at University of South Africa.

Career 

Before leaving the University of South Africa, Baloyi began his entrepreneurship journey by venturing into selling perfumes door-to-door. Baloyi was then selected to work for PwC South Africa under their graduate program eventually overperforming prompting the company to hire him on a full time basis and he was transferred to PwC Middle East in Dubai.

In 2015 Baloyi founded Bathu, a shoe company. The company owns and operates over 30 stores across South Africa and the SADC region. He was appointed a board member of South African Council of Shopping Centres (SACSC) in July 2022

Personal life 
Baloyi lives in Eye of Africa, Johannesburg.

References 

 

South African businesspeople
21st-century South African businesspeople
South African business executives
South African chief executives
South African company founders
South African corporate directors
Living people
University of South Africa alumni
South African designers
Year of birth missing (living people)